Corni is a commune in Botoșani County, Western Moldavia, Romania. It is composed of four villages: Balta Arsă, Corni, Mesteacăn and Sarafinești.

Natives
 Octav Băncilă

References

Communes in Botoșani County